Angel Falls is an American drama television series created by Joyce Eliason, that aired on CBS from August 26 to September 30, 1993.

Premise
Rae Dawn Snow moves back to her hometown of Angel Falls in Montana. She meets up with an old flame, while her 16-year-old son becomes involved with his daughter. The show follows the relationship between three families: The Snows, the Larsons and the Harrisons.

Cast
Chelsea Field as Rae Dawn Snow
Peggy Lipton as Hadley Larson
Grace Zabriskie as Cuema
Shirley Knight as Edie Wren Cox
Cassidy Rae as Molly Harrison
William Frankfather as Sheriff Bailey
Kim Cattrall as Genna Harrison
Shannon Wilcox as Rowena Dare
Jean Simmons as Irene Larson
Brian Kerwin as Eli Harrison
James Brolin as Luke Larson
Robert Rusler as Toby Riopelle
Ashlee Lauren as Sophie Harrison
Jeremy London as Sonny Snow
Marley Shelton as Brandi Dare
Jimmy Baker as Robbie Larson

Episodes

External links
 
 

1993 American television series debuts
1993 American television series endings
1990s American drama television series
CBS original programming
American television soap operas
English-language television shows
Television shows set in Montana